This article is a list of châteaux in Brittany, France.

Côtes-d'Armor
Former Duchy of Brittany, Departement 22.
Château de Bienassis, 15th and 16th centuries at Erquy. Park and gardens.  Classified as a Historic Monument.
Château de Caradeuc, at Plouasne
Château de La Caunelaye, at Corseul
Château de Coat-an-noz, at Belle-Isle-en-Terre
Château de Costaérès, at Trégastel
Château de Dinan, at Dinan. Musée.  Classified as a Historic Monument.
Fort-la-Latte, at Plévenon, Mediaeval fort rebuilt by Vauban. Classified as a Historic Monument.
Château de Guingamp, at Guingamp
Château de La Guyomarais, at Saint-Denoual
Château de Hac, at Quiou. Classified as a Historic Monument.
Château de la Hunaudaye, at Plédéliac. Classified as a Historic Monument.
Château de Lorge, at L'Hermitage-Lorge. Listed as an Historic Monument.
Château de Montafilant, 13th century, at Corseul. Listed as an Historic Monument.
Château de Monterfil, at Corseul (site gallo-romain). Listed as an Historic Monument.
Château de la Motte-Broons, at Broons (no visible remains)
Château du Plessis-Madeuc, 17th century, at Corseul
Château de Quintin, à Quintin. Classified as a Historic Monument.
Château de la Roche-Jagu, at Ploëzal. Classified as a Historic Monument.  Noted park and gardens "Jardin remarquable" (remarkable garden).
Château de Rosanbo, at Lanvellec. Listed as an Historic Monument.
Château des Salles, at Guingamp
Château de la Tandourie, 16th century, at Corseul
Château de Tonquédec, at Tonquédec. (ruin) Classified as a Historic Monument.
Château de Vaulembert, at Corseul
Manoir de Vaumadeuc, 15th century, at Pléven. Breton Renaissance. Listed as an Historic Monument.
Château de la Villeneuve, 17th century, at Lanmodez
Château du Guildo at Créhen. (ruin)

Finistère
Former Duchy of Brittany, Departement 29.
Fort de Bertheaume, at Plougonvelin
Château de Bodinio at Clohars-Fouesnant
Château de Brest, at Brest
Château de Châteaulin, at Châteaulin (ruin)
Château de Châteauneuf-du-Faou, at Châteauneuf-du-Faou (ruin)
Château de Cheffontaines, at Clohars-Fouesnant
Ville close de Concarneau, at Concarneau
Château de Guilguiffin, at Landudec
Château de Joyeuse Garde, at La Forest-Landerneau (ruin)
Château du Juch, at Juch
Château de Keraval, at Plomelin
Manoir de Kerazan, at Loctudy
Château de Kergos, at Clohars-Fouesnant
Château de Kergroadès, at Brélès
Château de Keriolet, at Concarneau
Château de Kerjean, at Saint-Vougay
Château de Kerlarec at Arzano.
Manoir de Kernuz, at Pont-l'Abbé
Château de Keroual, at Guilers
Château de Kerouzéré, at Sibiril (ruin)
Château de Lanniron, at Quimper
Manoir de Mézarnou, at Plounéventer (being restored)
Château du Pérennou, at Plomelin
Château de Pont-L'Abbé, at Pont-l'Abbé
Château de Quimerc'h (destroyed), at Bannalec
Château de La Roche-Maurice, at La Roche-Maurice (ruin)
Château de La Roche-Moisan, at Arzano (ruin)
Château de Rustéphan, at Pont-Aven (ruin)
Manoir de Stang-al-lin, at Concarneau
Château du Taureau, at Carantec, on the bay of Morlaix (castle)
Château de Trémazan, at Landunvez
Château de Trévarez, at Saint-Goazec

Ille-et-Vilaine
Former Duchy of  Brittany, Departement 35.
Château de La Ballue, 17th century at Bazouges-la-Pérouse. Noted gardens.
Château du Bois Cornillé, at Val-d'Izé
 Château du Bois Orcan, at Noyal-sur-Vilaine. Moyen-Âge/Renaissance. Noted park and gardens "Jardin remarquable" (remarkable garden).
Château de Bonnefontaine, 16th century at Antrain. Breton Renaissance, Park of 25 hectares.
Château de la Bourbansais, at Pleugueneuc. Zoo, Classified gardens.
Château de Boutavent, at Iffendic
Château de Caradeuc, at Bécherel. Park of 40 hectares.
Château de La Chapelle-Bouëxic, 15th and 17th century at La Chapelle-Bouëxic
Château de Châteaugiron, at Châteaugiron
Château de Combourg, XIIe et XVe, at Combourg. Cradle of romanticism, Childhood home of François-René de Chateaubriand, Classified park.
Château de Fougères, at Fougères (castle)
Manoir de Limoëlou, 16th century at Saint-Malo. Museum of Jacques Cartier.
Château de Montmarin, 18th century at Pleurtuit. Classified gardens.
Château de Montmuran, 12th, 14th and 17th century at Iffs. Associated with de Bertrand du Guesclin.
Château de la Motte-Jean, at Saint-Coulomb
Fort National, at Saint-Malo (castle)
Château du Nessay, at Saint-Briac-sur-Mer
Petit Bé, at Saint-Malo
Château des Rochers-Sévigné, at Vitré
Château de Saint-Aubin-du-Cormier, at Saint-Aubin-du-Cormier (ruin)
Château de Saint-Malo, at Saint-Malo
Tour Solidor, at Saint-Malo
Château de la Briantais, at Saint-Malo. Parc.
Malouinière de la Ville Bague, 18th century at Saint-Coulomb. Park.
Château de Vitré, at Vitré (castle)

Loire-Atlantique
Former Duchy of Brittany, Departement 44.
Château des ducs de Bretagne (the Palace of the Dukes of Brittany) at Nantes
Château de Blain, at Blain (castle)
Château de Bois-Briand, at Nantes
Château de la Bretesche, at Missillac
Château de Careil, at Guérande
Château de Chassay, at Sainte-Luce-sur-Loire
Château de Châteaubriant, at Châteaubriant (castle)
Château de Clermont, at Cellier
Château de Clisson, at Clisson (castle)
Château de la Motte-Glain, at La Chapelle-Glain
Château de l'Oiselinière, at Gorges
Château de la Pinelais, at Saint-Père-en-Retz
Château de Pornic, at Pornic
Château de Ranrouët, at Herbignac (castle)
Château de la Seilleraye, at Carquefou
See also List of châteaux in the Pays-de-la-Loire

Morbihan
Former Duchy of Brittany, Departement 56.

Notes and references

See also
 List of châteaux in Loire-Atlantique
 List of castles in France

 Brittany